Marisa is a genus of freshwater snails in the family Ampullariidae, the apple snails.

Species
There are two species:
 Marisa cornuarietis (Linnaeus, 1758)
 Marisa planogyra Pilsbry, 1933

Phylogeny
Based on analysis of mitochondrial 12S ribosomal RNA, 16S ribosomal RNA, and the cytochrome-c oxidase I (COI) gene, M. cornuarietis is a sister clade to M. planogyra and Asolene spixii, indicating that genus Marisa is not monophyletic.

References

Further reading
 Cowie R. H. & Thiengo S. C. (2003). The apple snails of the Americas (Mollusca: Gastropoda: Ampullariidae: Asolene, Felipponea, Marisa, Pomacea, Pomella): a nomenclatural and type catalog. Malacologia 45: 41-100.

Ampullariidae
Gastropod genera
Taxa named by John Edward Gray